Gwathmey may refer to:

Charles Gwathmey (1938–2009), American architect
James Tayloe Gwathmey (1862–1944), American physician and the first president of the American Association of Anesthetics
Robert Gwathmey (1903–1988), American painter
Rosalie Gwathmey (1908–2001), American photographer

Other
Gwathmey Siegel & Associates Architects, US-based architectural firm